Henry T. Botsford House is a historic house located at Greenville in Greene County, New York.

Description and history 
It was built in 1891 and is a three-story, irregularly massed Queen Anne style frame structure on a brick faced stone foundation. It features an engaged square corner tower. Also on the property is a carriage house built in 1894.

It was listed on the National Register of Historic Places on November 12, 1993.

References

Houses on the National Register of Historic Places in New York (state)
Queen Anne architecture in New York (state)
Houses completed in 1891
Houses in Greene County, New York
National Register of Historic Places in Greene County, New York